Jim or James Dietz may refer to:

 James Dietz (born 1946), contemporary artist
 Jim Dietz (baseball) (born 1939), American baseball player and coach
 Jim Dietz (rower) (born 1949), American rower and rowing coach